Europa Point F.C. is a football team from Gibraltar. The club currently plays in the Gibraltar National League the top senior tier of association football in Gibraltar. They also participate in the Rock Cup, the territory's primary cup competition.

History
The club formed in 2014 amidst the growing interest in association football on the territory of Gibraltar.  The club held trials specifically aimed at bringing in youth team players that had been released by professional sides in England and Spain with the goal of getting them back into competitive football, with club founder John Gontier having formerly worked with such players while working for League Football Education. Before their maiden season, the club also announced a partnership with Chesterfield in League One, where the English side has first option on any Europa Point player.

After a strong start to the season, including a tight promotion challenge against Gibraltar United, the club narrowly missed out on promotion, finishing third in the league despite having the strongest goalscoring record in the Gibraltar Second Division. Despite missing out on promotion on the final day of the season, the club did end the season with silverware as they beat promoted side Angels 5–3 in a thrilling Gibraltar Division 2 Cup final that went to extra time.

After missing out on promotion in 2014–15, Europa Point were crowned champions of the 2015–16 Gibraltar Second Division after an unbeaten league campaign (W17 D5) and completed the double by retaining the Gibraltar Second Division Cup by beating Bruno's Magpies 3–2 A.E.T in the final. In preparation for the new season in the Premier Division they have signed many players including ex-Norwich City players George Jermy and Tom Walters. However, the players failed to impress and despite substantial changes in playing and coaching staff throughout the season, Europa Point finished bottom of the Premier Division and were relegated.

On 1 November 2017, it was announced that an American consortium headed by Peter Grieve and Corey Woolfolk had purchased a controlling stake in Europa Point. Woolfolk took over as chairman of the club, while John Gontier moved to CEO. On 10 November, Joaquin Rodriguez was announced as the new Head of Commercial and Football Operations. As part of the takeover, Europa Point became a partner club to Bantu Rovers in Zimbabwe. Gontier negotiated to re-take control of the club in early 2019, helping the club to a second-place finish in the league.

In the inaugural season newly formed Gibraltar National League, Europa Point started poorly under former Gibraltar national football team manager Allen Bula. However, the appointment of ex-Leyton Orient boss Ian Hendon in late November 2019 saw a significant upturn in results, only for the season to be voided by the onset of the COVID-19 pandemic.

In July 2020, Andrew Pritchard purchased a majority stake in the club, while John Gontier stayed on as minority shareholder. Following the end of the 2020–21 season, Gontier sold his remaining stake in the club to focus on Gibraltar Women's Football League side Gibraltar Wave. In November 2021, former Charlton Athletic player and Kemi City chairman Mark Tivey was announced as the club's new co-owner and technical director.

In February 2022, West of Scotland Football League Premier Division side Rossvale announced new co-owner's, shareholder's and directors to their newly formed structure subject to SFA approval. Europa Point co-owners Mark Tivey and Andrew Pritchard MSc joined Chairman Dom McInally in forming the new structure of the club, subject to SFA approval. In doing so, the two clubs established a link with players moving between the two clubs.

Seasons

Current squad

First team
Correct as of 8 September 2022.

Out on loan

Club staff

Honours
Gibraltar National League - Challenge Group
Runners Up: ''2019–20
Gibraltar Second Division
Winners: 2015–16
Runners-up: 2018–19
Gibraltar Second Division Cup
Winners: 2014–15, 2015–16

Notes

References

External links
 
 

Association football clubs established in 2014
Football clubs in Gibraltar
Gibraltar National League clubs
2014 establishments in Gibraltar